Millom Without is a civil parish in the county of Cumbria, England. It had a population of 1,638 in 2001, decreasing to 859 at the 2011 Census. Millom Without forms part of the Borough of Copeland; the largest settlement in the parish is The Green.

Governance
An electoral ward in the same name exists. This ward stretches north-east to Ulpha with a total population as at the 2011 census of 1,369.

See also

Listed buildings in Millom Without

References

External links 

Its entry in the Old Cumbria Gazetteer
Millom Without Parish Council

Civil parishes in Cumbria
Borough of Copeland
Wards of Cumbria